The official title president of the council of state, or chairman of the council of state is used to describe the head of state of North Korea, and formerly used to describe the head of the state in Cuba and of the former communist states in the Democratic Republic of Germany, Poland, Romania, Bulgaria, Cambodia and Vietnam.

President of the State Affairs Commission of the Democratic People's Republic of Korea
President of the Council of State of Republic of Cuba
Chairman of the Council of State of the Socialist Republic of Vietnam
Chairman of the State Council of the German Democratic Republic
Chairman of the Council of State of the Polish People's Republic
President of the State Council of the Socialist Republic of Romania
Chairman of the State Council of the People's Republic of Bulgaria
Chairman of the Council of State of the People's Republic of Kampuchea

Heads of state
Presidents
Positions of authority
Leadership
Titles